Niki Haris (born April 17, 1962) is an American singer and dancer of pop, R&B, dance music and jazz, perhaps best known for having been one of Madonna's backing vocalists from 1987 to 2001, and as being the guest lead vocalist on various Snap! singles in the early 1990s.

Early life and family
Haris was born Gina Nichole Haire in Benton Harbor, Michigan on April 17, 1962, the daughter of Grammy Award nominated jazz artist Gene Harris. She attended college in Southern California before pursuing a singing career in amusement parks and clubs in the California area.

Haris gave birth to a daughter, Jordan Ann, in 2003. The father is Club Nouveau member, producer, songwriter (and Karyn White's manager) Jay King.

Music career
 
Haris was a friend and backing vocalist for Madonna and began working with Madonna in her Who's That Girl Tour. She appeared in the movie Truth or Dare, a documentary of backstage and onstage footage recorded during the Blond Ambition Tour. She also acted in the Madonna videos "Vogue" and "Music". Along with fellow singer Donna De Lory, Haris provided backup vocals on many of Madonna’s songs, appeared in numerous recorded and televised Madonna performances, and participated in four of Madonna’s eight concert tours, namely the Who's That Girl Tour (1987), the Blond Ambition Tour (1990), The Girlie Show Tour (1993) and The Drowned World Tour (2001). The Who’s That Girl Tour performance in Turin, Italy was broadcast live and eventually released on home video. One of The Girlie Show performances in Sydney, Australia was filmed for VHS/DVD, and the Drowned World Tour performance in Madonna’s hometown of Detroit, Michigan was broadcast live on HBO prior to VHS/DVD release.

During The Re-Invention Tour in 2004, Haris was replaced with Siedah Garrett. The official word from Haris was that she "would like to focus on her solo career and family." Haris was also absent from Madonna's following Confessions Tour, Sticky & Sweet Tour, MDNA Tour and Rebel Heart Tour.

Her vocal film work is also featured on the soundtracks of Corrina, Corrina, The Big Green, Noises Off, Coyote Ugly, Urban Legends: Bloody Mary and Anastasia. She has also recorded television themes, including co-writing and performing two songs for the Fox series Dark Angel.

Haris toured with her father, until his death, while promoting their albums, Down Home Blues and In His Hands and Jazz Alley Cats.

Haris performed at benefits for AIDS, cancer research and Camp Harmony for inner city children. She is a supporter for the Music in the Classroom program and Rockers Against Drunk Driving and is an annual participant in the Season for Non Violence. Niki has made several television appearances in 2008 & presently in 2009 including: The Democratic National Convention 2008, CNN, Fox Network & Fuse TV.

Collaborations
Haris has collaborated with many artists including, Michelle Branch, All Saints, Whitney Houston, Kylie Minogue, Anita Baker, Ray Charles, Karyn White, Prince, Mick Jagger, Julian Lennon, LeAnn Rimes, Luther Vandross, Jessica Simpson, Pussycat Dolls, Santana, The Righteous Brothers, Rufus, Enrique Iglesias, Marilyn Manson, Madonna, Tom Jones, Snap!, Joe Henry, Michael Bernard Beckwith and Ani DiFranco.
Niki appeared on Donna De Lory's 2013 album on a track called 'Kinder'.

Choreographer and acting career
Haris choreographed the MTV Awards for Madonna as well as providing some additional choreography on The Girlie Show, and for the television series Melrose Place. She helped stage scenes for Sharon Stone in Basic Instinct.

Haris has performed in lead appearances in Truth or Dare, was featured artist on the HBO special Sandra After Dark, and had a role in the film Heat.

Niki appeared in, and sang backing vocals for Pee-Wee's Playhouse Christmas Special.

Selected lead vocal credits
"Do Anything" by Natural Selection featuring Niki Haris (1991); (reached No. 2 on the Billboard Hot 100)
"There's No Business Like Show Business" (during credits of Noises Off...)
"Exterminate!", (1992 hit performed with Snap!)
"What's It Gonna Be" (early 1990s No. 1 dance club chart hit produced by John Jellybean Benitez)
"Do You See the Light (Looking For)" (1993 hit performed with Snap!, re-released and remixed for European market in 2002)
"Where Are the Boys, Where Are the Girls?" with Snap!. Featured on the CD album release of "Welcome to Tomorrow"
"Battle Hymn of the Republic" (from Gene Harris "In His Hands" (1996) album)
"Total Love" (hit single in Italy and Germany 2000-2001)
"The One" (co-written by Haris from Dark Angel Soundtrack, 2002)
"Let Me Hear the Music" (single from 2006 produced by L.E.X.– DJ Eddie X and Luigi Gonzalez– for 3 Monkeys Productions)
"I Will Always Be There" (Urban Legends: Bloody Mary Soundtrack)
"Bad, Bad Boy" (No. 1 on the U.S. Billboard Hot Dance Club Play chart in 2009)
"This Time Baby" (No. 5 on the U.S. Billboard Hot Dance Club Play chart in 2009)

Selected backing vocalist work for Madonna
Madonna's world tours: Who's That Girl (1987), Blond Ambition (1990), Girlie Show (1993) and Drowned World (2001).
Madonna music albums: Like a Prayer, I'm Breathless, The Immaculate Collection, Erotica, Bedtime Stories, Something to Remember and Ray of Light.
Various live performances with Madonna, including: MTV Video Music Awards, Grammy Awards, EMA Awards and television shows.

Albums
 Live in Switzerland (jazz)
 Niki Haris Live (jazz)
 Niki Haris and Friends (jazz)
 The Beginning (gospel)
 Dance (pop/dance)

Singles in charts

Filmography
Heat (1995), a Michael Mann action/drama film with Al Pacino and Robert De Niro
Visa commercial (2007) in which Haris stars in and sings the song "Downtown"

References

External links
Official Niki Haris Site
Niki Haris Myspace
Official Shakir Entertainment Site

1962 births
American dance musicians
American female dancers
American dancers
American women singers
Living people
People from Benton Harbor, Michigan
21st-century American women
Snap! members